Filip Kostić (born 1 November 1992) is a Serbian professional footballer who plays as a left winger or left wing-back for Italian Serie A club Juventus and the Serbia national team.

Club career

Radnički Kragujevac
Kostić made his senior debut with Radnički Kragujevac in 2010 at the age of 17. This was after the club was promoted to the Serbian SuperLiga from the Serbian First League. He began attracting the interest of several clubs including Red Star Belgrade, Anderlecht, Udinese, and Tottenham Hotspur. On 15 April 2012, he was named starting left winger in Sportal's ideal team of round 24 in the SuperLiga.

Groningen

On 4 April 2012, he signed a contract with Eredivisie side Groningen and moved to the Netherlands in June 2012 after the end of the season. He made his debut for Groningen on 21 October 2012. After getting little playing time, Kostić finally began showing promising potential from the beginning of the 2013–14 Eredivisie; he attracted media attention after playing a brilliant game in which he had one assist against NEC, and then on 25 August he added to his reputation of play-making by assisting twice against Go Ahead Eagles. Finally, on 20 October 2013, Kostić scored his first ever goal for Groningen in a 1–0 win against PSV Eindhoven. Kostić received criticism for a media interview after drawing 0–0 with Aberdeen F.C. in the second round of the Europa League qualifiers. He went on record after the match saying, “We go home happy, we have done 80% of what we need to go through”. Groningen went on to lose the tie with the Scottish club 1–2 at the Euroborg. Aberdeen winger Jonny Hayes was later quoted as saying "I was quite happy ramming their words down their throats".

VfB Stuttgart
On 9 August 2014 Filip Kostić moved to German side VfB Stuttgart for €6 million and a possible bonus of €1 million. Groningen also would get 15% of a future transfer fee received by Stuttgart. Kostić signed a contract until June 2019 with VfB Stuttgart.

Hamburger SV
After the relegation of VfB Stuttgart at the end of the season 2015–16, Kostić was transferred to Hamburger SV for a fee of €14 million, making him the most expensive player in the history of the club.

Eintracht Frankfurt
On 20 August 2018, after the relegation of Hamburg at the end of the season 2017–18, Kostić joined Eintracht Frankfurt on loan until the end of 2018–19 season.

On 17 May 2019, Frankfurt announced the permanent signing of Kostić on a permanent deal until 2023.

On 14 April 2022, Kostić scored two goals as Frankfurt defeated Barcelona 3–2 at the Camp Nou and 4–3 on aggregate in the UEFA Europa League to qualify for the semi-finals. Eintracht later won the Europa League, and Kostic was pronounced player of the season and was also top assists provider.

Juventus 
On 12 August 2022, Juventus announced the signing of Kostić on a four-year deal. In Derby d'Italia played on 19 March 2023, he scored the only goal in 1-0 victory against Inter.

International career
Kostić has played for Serbia at under-19 level and under-21 level. In the 2015 UEFA European Under-21 Championship qualification play-offs, he scored the winner against Spain.

On 7 June 2015, Kostić made his debut for the Serbia national senior team against Azerbaijan in a 4–1 friendly win in Sankt Pölten, Austria, making way for Lazar Marković after 56 minutes. He played in his first competitive match for Serbia on 13 June 2015 in the UEFA Euro 2016 qualifying Group I against Denmark. On 5 September 2016, he scored his 1st International goal against the Republic of Ireland in a 2–2 draw.

In June 2018, he was selected in Serbia's squad for the 2018 World Cup, playing all three group stage matches.

In November 2022, he was selected in Serbia's squad for the 2022 FIFA World Cup in Qatar. He played in group stage matches against Cameroon and Switzerland. Serbia finished fourth in the group.

Career statistics

Club

International

Scores and results list Serbia's goal tally first, score column indicates score after each Kostić goal.

Honours
Eintracht Frankfurt
UEFA Europa League: 2021–22

Individual
UEFA Europa League Squad of the Season: 2018–19, 2021–22
Bundesliga Team of the Season: 2019–20
UEFA Europa League Player of the Season: 2021–22
UEFA Europa League most assists: 2021–22

References

External links
Profile at the Juventus F.C. website
 

1992 births
Living people
Sportspeople from Kragujevac
Serbian footballers
Serbia international footballers
Association football midfielders
Serbia under-21 international footballers
FK Radnički 1923 players
Serbian SuperLiga players
FC Groningen players
Eredivisie players
VfB Stuttgart players
Hamburger SV players
Eintracht Frankfurt players
Juventus F.C. players
Bundesliga players
Serie A players
UEFA Europa League winning players
Serbian expatriate footballers
Expatriate footballers in the Netherlands
Expatriate footballers in Germany
Expatriate footballers in Italy
Serbian expatriate sportspeople in the Netherlands
Serbian expatriate sportspeople in Germany
Serbian expatriate sportspeople in Italy
2018 FIFA World Cup players
2022 FIFA World Cup players